Donald Smith may refer to:
Donald Smith, 1st Baron Strathcona and Mount Royal (1820–1914), Canadian railway financier and diplomat
Donald Smith (politician) (1905–1985), Canadian politician
Donald Smith (tenor) (1920–1998), Australian tenor
Donald MacKeen Smith (1923–1998), Canadian politician in the Nova Scotia House of Assembly
Donald Smith (cricketer, born 1923) (1923–2021), English cricketer
Donald J. Smith (1924–2013), Canadian business leader, entrepreneur, and philanthropist
Donald R. Smith (1926–1982), American politician in Illinois
Donald Smith (priest) (1926–2014), British Anglican priest, Archdeacon of Sudbury
Donald Smith (Lancashire cricketer) (1929–2004), English cricketer
Donald Smith (cricketer, born 1933) (1933–2015), English cricketer
Donald N. Smith (born 1940), American restaurant executive
Robin Donald (Donald Robin Smith, born 1942), Australian operatic tenor, son of the older tenor
John Gohorry (1943-2021), British poet, born Donald Smith
Zaid Abdul-Aziz (born 1946), American basketball player, born Donald Smith
Donald B. Smith (born 1947), U.S. Army brigadier general and Sheriff of Putnam County, New York
Donald Smith (American football coach) (born 1967), head college football coach at Kentucky State University, 2001–2003
Donald Smith (defensive back) (born 1968), Canadian football player
Donald Smith (academic) (born 1946), specialist of Québec literature and singer-songwriters

See also
Don Smith (disambiguation)
Donald Wood-Smith, professor of clinical surgery
Helen Donald-Smith, English Victorian artist